The Mercosur International or Mercosur Internacional is an open international badminton tournament in Brazil.The tournament established since June, 2013. The tournament has been an International Series level since 2013, then in 2015 categorized as International Challenge by the Badminton World Federation.

Previous Winners

References 

Badminton tournaments in Brazil
Sports competitions in Brazil